Sun of Jamaica, also known as Zauber der Karibik (English: Magic of the Caribbean), is the debut studio album by the German group Goombay Dance Band, released in 1980 by CBS Records.

The album achieved commercial success across Europe, including number 1 position in Austria. It spawned two major hits: "Sun of Jamaica" and "Aloha-Oe, Until We Meet Again".

Track listing
Side A
 "Goombay Dance" – 4:00
 "Sing Little Children (Bon Soir Dame)" – 2:40
 "Aloha-Oe, Until We Meet Again" – 3:45
 "Monkey" – 3:03
 "Caribbean Girl" – 3:42
 "Fly Flamingo" – 4:00

Side B
 "Sun of Jamaica" – 4:22
 "Bang Bang Lulu" – 2:27
 "Paradise of Joy" – 3:50
 "Conga Man" – 3:33
 "Island of Dreams" – 3:26
 "Take Me Home to Jamaica" – 2:48

Chart performance

Sales and certifications

References

External links
 Sun of Jamaica at Discogs
 Zauber der Karibik at Discogs

1980 albums
Goombay Dance Band albums